Statistics of Belgian First Division in the 1973–74 season.

Overview
It was contested by 16 teams, and R.S.C. Anderlecht won the championship.

League standings

Results

Play-off

References

Belgian Pro League seasons
Belgian
1973–74 in Belgian football